.sc is the Internet country code top-level domain (ccTLD) for Seychelles. The TLD was marketed to businesses in Scotland and the U.S. state of South Carolina, however, the domains are subject to Seychelles registry rules. While SCregistrars, a company who marketed .sc domains to a target audience of Scottish sites, has since closed down the .sc extension remains available through the Afilias Global platform via various well-known registrars internationally for direct registration at second-level.

Domain hacks 
The domain has also been used for domain hacks, such as by the website SoundCloud (due to its initials "SC"). For example, "exit.sc" was a domain set up by SoundCloud for tracking traffic leaving its website.

Third-level domains
 com.sc: commercial, for-profit organizations
 net.sc: network infrastructure machines and organizations
 edu.sc: educational institutions
 gov.sc: governmental institutions
 org.sc: miscellaneous, usually non-profit, organizations

Notes and references

See also
  for Scotland

External links
 IANA .sc whois information
 .sc domain registry
 Accredited .sc domain registrar

Country code top-level domains
Communications in Seychelles

sv:Toppdomän#S